PIMS may refer to:

Organizations
Pacific Institute for the Mathematical Sciences
Pakistan Institute of Medical Sciences
Pittsburgh Institute of Mortuary Science
Pontifical Institute of Mediaeval Studies
Pondicherry Institute of Medical Sciences
Pravara Institute of Medical Sciences

Computing
Parliamentary Information Management System
Partnership for Peace Information Management System
Profit impact of marketing strategy
Plant Information Management System

Medical
Paediatric multisystem inflammatory syndrome, associated with COVID-19

Other
 Pipeline Integrity Management Strategy, an engineering methodology to ensure integrity of pipelines, see Integrity engineering
 PiM's, a biscuit-like cake produced by LU
 Plasma Instrument for Magnetic Sounding, a plasma instrument on NASA's Europa Clipper

See also
 Project management information system (PMIS)
 Pimm's, an alcoholic beverage
 PIM (disambiguation)